Dead Horse Island is a 230-acre private island in the San Joaquin River delta, in California. It is located in Sacramento County, owned by the Wilson Family and managed by Reclamation District 2111.

References

Islands of Sacramento County, California
Islands of the Sacramento–San Joaquin River Delta
Islands of Northern California